List of cities and towns in East Prussia, as used before 1945:

This article is a translation of the German Wikipedia's Liste der Städte in Ostpreußen article.

See also 

List of city name changes overview
German exonyms
List of European exonyms
German exonyms (Kaliningrad Oblast)
List of settlements in Kaliningrad Oblast
List of renamed cities and towns in Russia
List of renamed cities in Lithuania

East Prussia, cities and towns
Prussia
Cities